Imperial Chemical Industries (ICI) was a British chemical company. It was, for much of its history, the largest manufacturer in Britain.
It was formed by the merger of four leading British chemical companies in 1926.
Its headquarters were at Millbank in London. ICI was a constituent of the FT 30 and later the FTSE 100 indices.

ICI made general chemicals, plastics, paints, pharmaceuticals and speciality products, including food ingredients, speciality polymers, electronic materials, fragrances and flavourings.
In 2008, it was acquired by AkzoNobel,
which immediately sold parts of ICI to Henkel and integrated ICI's remaining operations within its existing organisation.

History

Development of the business (1926–1944) 

The company was founded in December 1926 from the merger of four companies: Brunner Mond, Nobel Explosives, the United Alkali Company, and British Dyestuffs Corporation. It established its head office at Millbank in London in 1928.
Competing with DuPont and IG Farben, the new company produced chemicals, explosives, fertilisers, insecticides, dyestuffs, non-ferrous metals, and paints.
In its first year turnover was £27 million.

In the 1920s and 1930s, the company played a key role in the development of new chemical products, including the dyestuff phthalocyanine (1929), the acrylic plastic Perspex (1932), Dulux paints (1932, co-developed with DuPont), polyethylene (1937), and polyethylene terephthalate fibre known as Terylene (1941).
In 1940, ICI started British Nylon Spinners as a joint venture with Courtaulds.

ICI also owned the Sunbeam motorcycle business, which had come with Nobel Industries, and continued to build motorcycles until 1937.

During the Second World War, ICI was involved with the United Kingdom's nuclear weapons programme codenamed Tube Alloys.

Postwar innovation (1945–1990) 

In the 1940s and 1950s, the company established its pharmaceutical business and developed a number of key products, including Paludrine (1940s, an anti-malarial drug), halothane (1951, an inhalational anaesthetic agent), propofol (1977, an intravenous anaesthetic agent), Inderal (1965, a beta-blocker), tamoxifen (1978, a frequently used drug for breast cancer),
and PEEK (1979, a high performance thermoplastic). ICI formed ICI Pharmaceuticals in 1957.

ICI developed a fabric in the 1950s known as Crimplene, a thick polyester yarn used to make a fabric of the same name.
The resulting cloth is heavy and wrinkle-resistant, and retains its shape well.
The California-based fashion designer Edith Flagg was the first to import this fabric from Britain to the United States.
During the first two years, ICI gave Flagg a large advertising budget to popularise the fabric across America.

In 1960, Paul Chambers became the first chairman appointed from outside the company.
Chambers employed the consultancy firm McKinsey to help with reorganising the company. His eight-year tenure saw export sales double, but his reputation was severely damaged by a failed takeover bid for Courtaulds in 1961–62.

ICI was confronted with the nationalisation of its operations in Burma on 1 August 1962 as a consequence of the military coup.

In 1964, ICI acquired British Nylon Spinners (BNS), the company it had jointly set up in 1940 with Courtaulds.
ICI surrendered its 37.5 per cent holding in Courtaulds and paid Courtaulds £2 million a year for five years, "to take account of the future development expenditure of Courtaulds in the nylon field."
In return, Courtaulds transferred to ICI their 50 per cent holding in BNS. BNS was absorbed into ICI's existing polyester operation, ICI Fibres. The acquisition included BNS production plants in Pontypool, Gloucester and Doncaster, together with research and development in Pontypool.

Early pesticide development under ICI Plant Protection Division, with its plant at Yalding, Kent, research station at Jealott's Hill and HQ at Fernhurst Research Station included paraquat (1962, a herbicide), the insecticides pirimiphos-methyl in 1967 and pirimicarb in 1970, brodifacoum (a rodenticide) was developed in 1974; in the late 1970s, ICI was involved in the early development of synthetic pyrethroid insecticides such as lambda-cyhalothrin.

Peter Allen was appointed chairman between 1968 and 1971. He presided over the purchase of Viyella. Profits shrank under his tenure. During his tenure, ICI created the wholly owned subsidiary Cleveland Potash Ltd, for the construction of Boulby Mine in Redcar and Cleveland, North Yorkshire. The first shaft was dug in 1968, with full production from 1976. ICI jointly owned the mine with Anglo American, and then with De Beers, before complete ownership was transferred to Israel Chemicals Ltd in 2002.

Jack Callard was appointed chairman from 1971 to 1975. He almost doubled company profits between 1972 and 1974, and made ICI Britain's largest exporter. In 1971, the company acquired Atlas Chemical Industries Inc., a major American competitor.

In 1977, Imperial Metal Industries was divested as an independent quoted company.
From 1982 to 1987, the company was led by the charismatic John Harvey-Jones.
Under his leadership, the company acquired the Beatrice Chemical Division in 1985 and Glidden Coatings & Resins, a leading paints business, in 1986.

Reorganisation of the business (1991–2007) 
By the early 1990s, plans were carried out to demerge the company, as a result of increasing competition and internal complexity that caused heavy retrenchment and slowing innovation. In 1991, ICI sold the agricultural and merchandising operations of BritAg and Scottish Agricultural Industries to Norsk Hydro,
and fought off a hostile takeover bid from Hanson, who had acquired 2.8 percent of the company.
It also divested its soda ash products arm to Brunner Mond, ending an association with the trade that had existed since the company's inception, one that had been inherited from the original Brunner, Mond & Co. Ltd.

In 1992, the company sold its nylon business to DuPont.
In 1993, the company de-merged its pharmaceutical bio-science businesses: pharmaceuticals, agrochemicals, specialities, seeds and biological products were all transferred into a new and independent company called Zeneca. Zeneca subsequently merged with Astra AB to form AstraZeneca.

Charles Miller Smith was appointed CEO in 1994, one of the few times that someone from outside ICI had been appointed to lead the company, Smith having previously been a director at Unilever.
Shortly afterwards, the company acquired a number of former Unilever businesses in an attempt to move away from its historical reliance on commodity chemicals.    
In 1995, ICI acquired the American paint companies Devoe Paints, Fuller-O'Brien Paints and Grow Group. In 1997, ICI acquired National Starch & Chemical, Quest International, Unichema, and Crosfield, the speciality chemicals businesses of Unilever for $8 billion.
This step was part of a strategy to move away from cyclical bulk chemicals and to progress up the value chain to become a higher growth, higher margin business.
Later that year it went on to buy Rutz & Huber, a Swiss paints business.

Having taken on some £4 billion of debt to finance these acquisitions, the company had to sell off its commodity chemicals businesses:
 Disposals of bulk chemicals businesses at that time included the sale of its Australian subsidiary, ICI Australia, for £1 billion in 1997, and of its polyester chemicals business to DuPont for $3 billion also in 1997.
 In 1998, it bought Acheson Industries Inc., an electronic chemicals business.
 In 2000, ICI sold its diisocyanate, advanced materials, and speciality chemicals businesses on Teesside and worldwide (including plants at Rozenburg in the Netherlands, and South Africa, Malaysia and Taiwan), and Tioxide, its titanium dioxide subsidiary, to Huntsman Corporation for £1.7 billion. It also sold the last of its industrial chemicals businesses to Ineos for £325 million.
 In 2002, the ICI wholly transferred ownership of Boulby Mine to Israel Chemicals Ltd.
 In 2006, the Company sold Quest International, its flavours and fragrances business, to Givaudan, for £1.2 billion and Uniqema, its oleochemical business, to Croda International, for £410 million.

Having sold much of its historically profitable commodities businesses, and many of the new speciality businesses which it had failed to integrate, the company consisted mainly of the Dulux paints business, which quickly found itself the subject of a takeover by AkzoNobel.

Takeover by AkzoNobel 

Dutch firm AkzoNobel (owner of Crown Berger paints) bid £7.2 billion (€10.66 billion or $14.5 billion) for ICI in June 2007.
An area of concern about a potential deal was ICI's British pension fund, which had a deficit of almost £700 million and future liabilities of more than £9 billion at the time.
Regulatory issues in the UK and other markets where Dulux and Crown Paints brands each have significant market share were also a cause for concern for the boards of ICI and AkzoNobel.
In the UK, any combined operation without divestments would have seen AkzoNobel have a 54 per cent market share in the paint market.
The initial bid was rejected by the ICI board and the majority of shareholders.
However, a subsequent bid for £8 billion (€11.82 billion) was accepted by ICI in August 2007, pending approval by regulators.

On 2 January 2008, completion of the takeover of ICI plc by AkzoNobel was announced.
Shareholders of ICI received either £6.70 in cash or AkzoNobel loan notes to the value of £6.70 per one nominal ICI share.
The adhesives business of ICI was transferred to Henkel as a result of the deal,
while AkzoNobel agreed to sell its Crown Paints subsidiary to satisfy the concerns of the European Commissioner for Competition.
The areas of concern regarding the ICI UK pension scheme were addressed by ICI and AkzoNobel.

Operations 

ICI operated a number of chemical sites around the world.
In the UK, the main plants were as follows:
 Billingham Manufacturing Plant (in Stockton-on-Tees) and Wilton (in present-day Redcar and Cleveland): ICI used the Billingham site to manufacture fertilisers in the 1920s and went on to produce plastics at Billingham in 1934. During World War II it manufactured Synthonia, a synthetic ammonia for explosives. The Wilton R&D site was built to support the plastics division with R&D and chemical engineering facilities. The ICI Billingham Division was split into the ICI Heavy Organic Chemicals Division and ICI Agricultural Division in the 1960s. From 1971 to 1988 ICI Physics and Radioisotopes Section (later known as Tracerco) operated a small General Atomics TRIGA Mark I nuclear reactor at its Billingham factory for the production of radioisotopes used in the manufacture of flow and level instruments, among other products. The Agricultural Division was noted for the development of the world's largest bioreactor at the time – the 1.5 million litre Pruteen Reactor, used for the cultivation of animal feed. Engineering models of components and the builder's model of the complete plant are now in the collection of the Science Museum London. Pruteen had limited economic success but was followed by the much more successful development of Quorn.
 Blackley (in Manchester) and Huddersfield: ICI used the sites to manufacture dyestuffs. The dye business, known as the ICI Dyestuffs Division in the 1960s, went through several reorganisations. Huddersfield was tied in with Wilton with the production of nitrobenzene and nitrotoluene. Huddersfield also produced insecticides. (Syngenta still manufacture insecticides at Huddersfield). Proxel Biocide was made at Huddersfield from the 80's onwards. Additives also made at Huddersield.  Huddersfield became Zeneca then AstraZeneca, in 2004 Huddersfield was Syngenta, Avecia, Arch and Lubrizol running what were all ICI plants at one time.    Through the years it was combined with other speciality chemicals businesses and became Organics Division. Then became ICI Colours and Fine Chemicals and then ICI Specialties.
 Runcorn (in Cheshire): ICI operated a number of separate sites within the Runcorn area, including the Castner-Kellner site, where ICI manufactured chlorine and sodium hydroxide (caustic soda). Adjacent to the Castner-Kellner site was Rocksavage works, where a variety of chemicals based on chlorine products were manufactured, including Chloromethanes, Arklone dry cleaning fluid, Trichloethylene degreasing fluid and the Arcton range of CFCs. Also on that site were PVC manufacture and HF (Hydrogen fluoride) manufacture. At Runcorn Heath Research Laboratories, technical support, research and development for Mond Division products was carried out, and the support sections included chemical plan design and engineering sections.  Just to the north of Runcorn, on an island between the Manchester Ship Canal and the River Mersey could be found the Wigg Works, which had been erected originally for producing poison gas in wartime. In Widnes could also be found several factories producing weedkillers and other products. For many years it was known as ICI Mond Division but later became part of the ICI Chemicals and Polymers Division. The Runcorn site was also responsible for the development of the HiGEE and Spinning Disc Reactor concepts. These were originated by Professor Colin Ramshaw and led to the concept of Process Intensification; research into these novel technologies is now being pursued by the Process Intensification Group at Newcastle University.
 Winnington and Wallerscote (in Northwich, Cheshire): It was here that ICI manufactured sodium carbonate (soda ash) and its various by-products such as sodium bicarbonate (bicarbonate of soda), and sodium sesquicarbonate. The Winnington site, built in 1873 by the entrepreneurs John Tomlinson Brunner and Ludwig Mond, was also the base for the former company Brunner, Mond & Co. Ltd. and, after the merger which created ICI, the powerful and influential Alkali Division. It was at the laboratories on this site that polythene was discovered by accident in 1933 during experiments into high pressure reactions. Wallerscote was built in 1926, its construction delayed by the First World War, and became one of the largest factories devoted to a single product (soda ash) in the world. However, the decreasing importance of the soda ash trade to ICI in favour of newer products such as paints and plastics, meant that in 1984 the Wallerscote site was closed, and thereafter mostly demolished. The laboratory where polythene was discovered was sold off and the building became home to a variety of businesses including a go-kart track and paintballing, and the Winnington Works were divested to the newly formed company, Brunner Mond, in 1991. It was again sold in 2006, to Tata (an Indian-based company) and in 2011 was re branded as Tata Chemicals Europe. The Winnington plant closed in February 2014, with the last shift on 2 February bringing to a close 140 years of soda ash production in this Northwich site.
 Ardeer (in Stevenston, Ayrshire): ICI Nobel used the site to manufacture dynamite and other explosives and nitrocellulose-based products. For a time, the site also produced nylon and nitric acid. Nobel Enterprises was sold in 2002 to Inabata.
Penrhyndeudraeth (Gwynedd, North Wales): Cooke’s Works, part of ICI’s Nobel’s Explosives Company division produced nitroglycerine-based explosives up until the site’s closure in 1995. 
 Slough (in Berkshire): Headquarters of ICI Paints Division.
 Welwyn Garden City (in Hertfordshire): Headquarters of ICI Plastics Division until the early 1990s.

Argentina 
An ICI subsidiary called Duperial operated in Argentine from 1928 to 1995, when it was renamed ICI.

Established in the city of San Lorenzo, Santa Fe,
it operates an integrated production site with commercial offices in Buenos Aires. Since 2009 it has made sulphuric acid with ISO certification under the company name Akzo Nobel Functional Chemicals S.A.

It also had an operation at Palmira, Mendoza,  for its Wine Chemicals Division, that manufactured tartaric acid, wine alcohol and grapeseed oil from natural raw material coming from the wine industry in the provinces of Mendoza and San Juan. This operation held 10% world market share for tartaric acid. It was sold in 2008 and currently operates as Derivados Vínicos S.A. (DERVINSA).

Australia 
The subsidiary ICI Australia Ltd established the Dry Creek Saltfields at Dry Creek north of Adelaide, South Australia, in 1940, with an associated soda ash plant at nearby Osborne.
In 1989, these operations were sold to Penrice Soda Products.
An ICI plant was built at Botany Bay in New South Wales in the 1940s and was sold to Orica in 1997.

The plant once manufactured paints, plastics and industrial chemicals such as solvents. It was responsible for the Botany Bay Groundwater Plume contamination of a local aquifer.

Bangladesh 
In 1968 a subsidiary of Imperial Chemical Industries (ICI) was established in then-East Pakistan.
After Bangladesh gained independence in 1971, the company was incorporated on 24 January 1973 as ICI Bangladesh Manufacturers Limited and also as Public Limited Company. The company divested its investment in Bangladesh and was renamed as Advanced Chemical Industries Limited (ACI Limited) on 5 May 1992. The company sold its insect control, air care and toilet care brands to SC Johnson & Son in 2015. Currently Advanced Chemical Industries (ACI) Limited is one of the largest conglomerates in Bangladesh with a multinational heritage operating across the country. The company operates through three reporting divisions: Pharmaceuticals, Consumer Brands and Agribusiness.

Sri Lanka 
ICI maintained offices in Colombo importing and supplying chemicals for manufacturers in Ceylon. In 1964, following import restrictions that allowed only locally owned subsidiaries of multinational companies to gain import licenses, Chemical Industries (Colombo) Limited was formed as an ICI subsidiary with 49% ICI ownership and remaining held public.

New Zealand 
The subsidiary ICI New Zealand provided substantial quantities of chemical products – including swimming pool chemicals, commercial healthcare products, herbicides and pesticides for use within New Zealand and the neighbouring Pacific Islands.

A fire at the ICI New Zealand store in Mount Wellington, Auckland, on 21 December 1984, killed an ICI employee and caused major health concerns. Over 200 firefighters were exposed to toxic smoke and effluents during the firefighting efforts. Six firefighters retired for medical reasons as a result of the fire. This incident was a major event in the history of the New Zealand Fire Service and subject to a formal investigation, led by future Chief Justice Sian Elias. The fire was a trigger for major reforms of the service; direct consequences included improved protective clothing for firefighters, a standard safety protocol for major incidents, the introduction of dedicated fireground safety officers, and changes to occupational health regulations.

See also 

 Imperial Chemical House
 IMI plc (formerly Imperial Metal Industries)
 Pharmaceutical industry in the United Kingdom

References

Further reading 
 
 

 
AstraZeneca
British companies established in 1926
British companies disestablished in 2008
Chemical companies established in 1926
Chemical companies of the United Kingdom
Former defence companies of the United Kingdom
Companies formerly listed on the London Stock Exchange
Paint and coatings companies of the United Kingdom
1926 establishments in England
2008 mergers and acquisitions